is a railway station in  the city of Ōmachi, Nagano, Japan, operated by the East Japan Railway Company (JR East).

Lines
Uminokuchi Station is served by the Ōito Line and is 42.9 kilometers from the terminus of the line at Matsumoto Station.

Station layout
The station consists of one ground-level side platform serving a single bi-directional track. The platform is short, and can only accommodate three carriage trains. The station is unattended.

History
Uminokuchi Station opened on 25 September 1929. With the privatization of Japanese National Railways (JNR) on 1 April 1987, the station came under the control of JR East.

Surrounding area
Lake Kizaki

See also
 List of railway stations in Japan

References

External links

 JR East station information 

Railway stations in Nagano Prefecture
Ōito Line
Railway stations in Japan opened in 1929
Stations of East Japan Railway Company
Ōmachi, Nagano